Protein music (DNA music or genetic music) is a musical technique where music is composed by converting protein sequences or genes to musical notes. It is a theoretical method made by Joël Sternheimer, who is a physicist, composer and mathematician.

The first published references to protein music in the scientific literature are a paper co-authored by a member of The Shamen in 1996,
and a short correspondence by Hayashi and Munakata in Nature in 1984.

Theory
In Gödel, Escher, Bach, Douglas Hofstadter draws similarities and analogies between genes and music.
It even proposes that meaning is constructed in protein and in music.

The ideas that supports the possibility of creating harmonic musics using this method are:
 The repetition process governs both the musical composition and the DNA sequence construction.
 The conformations and energetics of the protein secondary and tertiary structures at the atomic level. See also for full compositions made using this concept.
 Pink noise (the correlation structure "1/f spectra") have been found in both musical signals and DNA sequences.
 Models with duplication and mutation operations, such as the "expansion-modification model" are able to generate sequences with 1/f spectra.
 When DNA sequences are converted to music, it sounds musical.
 Human Genome Project has revealed similar genetic themes not only between species, but also between proteins.

Musical renditions of DNA and proteins is not only a music composition method, but also a technique for studying genetic sequences. Music is a way of representing sequential relationships in a type of informational string to which the human ear is keenly attuned. The analytic and educational potential of using music to represent genetic patterns has been recognized from secondary school to university level.

Practice
 Examples of simple protein structures converted to midi music file show the independence of protein music from musical instrument, and the convenience of using protein structures in music composition.
 The software Algorithmic arts can convert raw genetic data (freely available for download on the web) to music. There are many examples of musics generated by this software, both by designer and by others.
 Several people have composed musics using protein structure, and several students and professors have used music as a method to study proteins. The recording Sounds of HIV is a musical adaptation of the genetic material of HIV/AIDS.

References

Further reading
Journal articles, Arranged by post date:

External links
 Clark, M. A. "A Protein Primer: A Musical Introduction to Protein Structure", WhoZoo.org. See: Henahan, Sean (03/20/98) "Protein Preludes", AccessExcellence.com.
 Your DNA Song "Protein Code to Music Translation",

Experimental music genres
Musical techniques
Proteins